Hesar-e Qazi (also Romanized as Ḩeşār-e Qāẕī and Ḩeşār Qāẕī) is a village in Behnamarab-e Jonubi Rural District, Javadabad District, Varamin County, Tehran Province, Iran. At the 2006 census, its population was 706, in 161 families.

References 

Populated places in Varamin County